Limnonectes ferneri is a species of fanged frogs in the family Dicroglossidae. It is endemic to Mindanao, Philippines, where it was recorded on Mount Pasian, Monkayo, Compostela Valley.

References

 Siler, McVay, Diesmos & Brown, 2009 : A new species of fanged frog, genus Limnonectes (Amphibia: Anura: Dicroglossidae) from Southeast Mindanao Island, Philippines. Herpetologica,  (original text).
http://research.amnh.org/vz/herpetology/amphibia/Amphibia/Anura/Dicroglossidae/Dicroglossinae/Limnonectes/Limnonectes-ferneri

ferneri
Fauna of Mindanao
Amphibians of the Philippines
Frogs of Asia
Amphibians described in 2009